Events from the year 2013 in the United Arab Emirates.

Incumbents
President: Khalifa bin Zayed Al Nahyan 
Prime Minister: Mohammed bin Rashid Al Maktoum

Events

February
 February 4 - A collision between a truck and a bus carrying Bangladeshi workers kills 22 people and injures 24 others in Al Ain.

April
 April 18 - Authorities in the United Arab Emirates say they have arrested seven suspected members of an al-Qaeda-linked "terrorist cell" seeking to carry out operations in the country and the region.

July
 July 2 - 68 Islamists accused of conspiring against the United Arab Emirates federal government, sentenced to 15 years.
 July 17 - In a new law the United Arab Emirates is offering citizens a gram of gold for every kilogram of weight they lose in an attempt to curb the rising obesity rate in the nation.

August
 August 19 - Attorney general Mohammad Ishaq Aloko is fired by Afghan President Hamid Karzai, over an unsanctioned meeting with Taliban peace negotiators in the United Arab Emirates.

Sports
 Dubai World Cup

 
Years of the 21st century in the United Arab Emirates
United Arab Emirates
United Arab Emirates
2010s in the United Arab Emirates